The 2006 World Rowing Championships were World Rowing Championships that were held from 20 to 27 August 2006 at Dorney Lake, Eton, Great Britain.

Medal summary

Men
 Non-Olympic classes

Women
 Non-Olympic classes

Wettbewerbe des Pararuderns 
Die Weltmeisterschaftsrennen in den Klassen des Pararudern werden über 1000 Meter ausgetragen.

Medal table

References

External links
Archive of 2006 World Rowing Championships official website
Results
World Championship Medal Winners

World Rowing Championships
World Rowing Championships
Rowing in Berkshire
Rowing Championships
2000s in Berkshire
Rowing
Rowing
Rowing